The mixed team relay in short track speed skating at the 2012 Winter Youth Olympics was held on 21 January at the Eisschnelllaufbahn Innsbruck.

Results 
 QA – qualified for Final A
 QB – qualified for Final B
 PEN – penalty

Semifinals

Final B

Final A

References 

 
Mixed team relay